Aulonemia humillima is a species of Aulonemia bamboo.

Distribution
It is part of the grass family and endemic to Latin America.

References

humillima